The 2015 Oklahoma City Energy FC season is the club's second season in existence, and their second season playing in the USL, the third tier of the American soccer pyramid.

Background 
This is the first season where Oklahoma City Energy FC plays its full season at Taft Stadium.

Review

Roster

Competitions

IMG Suncoast Pro Classic

Preseason

USL

Results summary

USL Playoffs

Conference semifinal

Conference Finals

Standings

U.S. Open Cup 

Oklahoma City Energy FC entered the U.S. Open Cup in the second round.

Statistics

Transfers

Transfers In

Loans in

See also 
Oklahoma City Energy FC
2015 in American soccer
2015 USL season

References 

Oklahoma City
American soccer clubs 2015 season
2015 in sports in Oklahoma
Soccer in Oklahoma
2015